Komerabanda (Village ID 574713) is a village and panchayat in Ranga Reddy district, AP, India. It falls under Shabad mandal. According to the 2011 census it has a population of 1063 living in 240 households.

References

Villages in Ranga Reddy district